Õhtuleht (Evening Paper) is the largest daily newspaper in Estonia. It is a tabloid newspaper. The newspaper is published in Tallinn in the Estonian language.

History and profile
Õhtuleht was established in 1944. On 3 July 2000 two rival tabloid papers in Estonia, Õhtuleht and Sõnumileht (The Messenger), merged, becoming SL Õhtuleht. Since 6 October 2008 the name was shortened back to Õhtuleht.

The paper has a liberal-conservative political stance. It is owned by Eesti Meedia which also owns Postimees and which in turn is owned by Schibsted, a Norwegian media group, and by Ekspress Grupp.

Õhtuleht is available online at Ohtuleht.ee. Initially, at first the online version was just a copy of the paper, but now is turning into an online news stream and an entertainment centre with approx. 150,000 users.

References

External links 
 Õhtuleht online

Newspapers published in Estonia
Estonian-language newspapers
Mass media in Tallinn
Publications established in 1944
1944 establishments in the Soviet Union